Kaspars Dubra (born 20 December 1990) is a Latvian professional football defender who plays for RFS. He plays as a centre-back and as a defensive midfielder.

Club career

Skonto Riga

Dubra started playing football at the age of seven, as a youth player he played for Skonto Riga academy JFC Skonto. In 2007, he was taken to the first team by that time manager Paul Ashworth, but didn't appear on the pitch that season.

Before the start of the 2008 season Dubra was loaned out to another Latvian Higher League club located in Riga JFK Olimps. He played 25 matches through the season and managed to score twice. In 2009 Dubra was taken back to Skonto, but, playing only one match, was once again loaned to Olimps, playing 9 games and scoring once during this loan spell.

In 2010, Dubra was one of several Olimps players to be taken to Skonto by the club's new manager Aleksandrs Starkovs. Dubra made a surprisingly good impact and earned himself a place in the starting line-up right after joining. Being one of the best defenders in the league during the season, all in all he made 19 appearances and scored 5 goals for Skonto and helped his team become the champions of Latvian Higher League. In July 2010 he was named the best player of the month, being the only defender to receive this award during the season. At the end of the season he was included in the team of the tournament. In November 2010 Dubra went on trial with the English Premier League club Blackpool.

In 2011, Dubra suffered from a serious injury and managed to return to the pitch only at the end of the season, playing only 6 league matches. On 1 January his contract with Skonto Riga expired, and Kaspars went on trial with the English Premier League club Wolverhampton Wanderers, Kaspars has left a good impression on Mick McCarthy coach of Wolverhampton Wanderers, but his agent couldn't agree on a deal.

Polonia Bytom

Being linked with several Polish, Russian and Ukrainian clubs, Dubra signed with Polish I liga club Polonia Bytom for a one and a half-year contract with them in February 2012. After playing just 4 league games in July 2012 he terminated the contract with Polonia Bytom.

FK Ventspils

In July 2012, he joined the Latvian Higher League club FK Ventspils. He signed a contract till June 2015.

In May 2013, Dubra scored a goal against FK Liepājas Metalurgs and brought victory in the cup final in Latvia.

Irtysh Pavlodar
On 4 January 2019, Dubra joined Kazakh club FC Irtysh Pavlodar. On 3 July 2019, Dubra was released by Irtysh Pavlodar.

International career

Dubra is a current member of Latvia. He also played for Latvia U-21 and Latvia U-19. Kaspars was firstly called up to Latvia national football team by coach Aleksandrs Starkovs for a friendly match in Kunming against China on 17 November 2010. He made his debut, being just 19 years old, coming on as a substitute in the 90th minute. Kaspars played all game against Lithuania in Baltic Cup 2014 final. Latvia won the Baltic Cup.

Career statistics

International goals
Scores and results list Latvia's goal tally first.

Honours

Club
Skonto Riga
Virsliga: 2010
Baltic League: 2010–11

Ventspils
Virsliga: 2013, 2014
Latvian Cup: 2012–13

BATE Borisov
Belarusian Premier League: 2015, 2016
Belarusian Cup: 2014–15
Belarusian Super Cup: 2015, 2016

International
Baltic Cup: 2014, 2018

Individual
Latvian Higher League Player of the Month: June 2010
Latvian Higher League Best Defender: 2014

References

External links
 
 

1990 births
Living people
Footballers from Riga
Latvian footballers
Association football defenders
Latvia international footballers
Latvian expatriate footballers
Expatriate footballers in Poland
Expatriate footballers in Belarus
Latvian expatriate sportspeople in Poland
Skonto FC players
JFK Olimps players
Polonia Bytom players
FK Ventspils players
FC BATE Borisov players
FK RFS players
FC Irtysh Pavlodar players
Kazakhstan Premier League players
Expatriate footballers in Kazakhstan
Ukrainian Premier League players
FC Oleksandriya players
Expatriate footballers in Ukraine
Latvian expatriate sportspeople in Ukraine